= Republic of Dominica =

Republic of Dominica may refer to:

- Dominican Republic, a country located on the island of Hispaniola, in the Greater Antilles, in the Caribbean
- Commonwealth of Dominica, an island country, in the Lesser Antilles, in the Caribbean
